GD 362 is a white dwarf approximately 150 light years from Earth.  In 2004, spectroscopic observations showed that it had a relatively high concentration of metals in its atmosphere.  Since the high gravitational field of white dwarfs quickly forces heavy elements to settle towards the bottom of the atmosphere, this meant that the atmosphere was being polluted by an external source.  In 2005, infrared photometric observations suggested that it was surrounded by a ring of dust with size comparable to the rings of Saturn, providing an explanation for this pollution.

In 2006, Benjamin Zuckerman, Michael Jura and other astronomers used the Keck telescope to obtain high-resolution spectra of GD 362 which showed that heavy elements in the star's atmosphere occurred in concentrations similar to those in the Earth-Moon system.  The group concluded that a possible origin for GD 362's dust ring and atmospheric pollutants was that a rocky asteroid about 200 km in diameter was disintegrated by tidal effects between 100,000 and 1 million years ago.  If this was the origin, the spectra indicate that the asteroid should have had composition similar to the Earth's crust, suggesting that the star might have had an Earth-like planet before it entered its red giant phase.

GD 362 has been a white dwarf for approximately 900 million years.

External links
 Universe Today, Dead Star Found Polluted By Earthlike Planet
 Astronomy Now, Doomed planet may have been drenched in water

References

Hercules (constellation)
White dwarfs
Circumstellar disks